The 2008–09 Ukrainian First League is the eighteenth since its establishment. The Professional Football League (PFL) decreased the number of teams in the league. This season, there are 18 teams instead of 20 teams competing. Two of the teams were relegated from the 2007–08 Ukrainian Premier League and two were promoted from the 2007–08 Ukrainian Second League. To decrease the number of teams in the competition 4 teams were relegated from the 2007–08 Ukrainian First League season.

Teams

Promoted teams
Both of the following two teams were promoted from Druha Liha and debuting in the Ukrainian First League:
Group A
Knyazha Schaslyve – Druha Liha champion (debut)
Group B
Komunalnyk Luhansk – Druha Liha champion (debut)

Relegated teams 
Two teams were relegated from the Ukrainian Premier League 2007–08 season after finishing on the bottom of the competition:
 Naftovyk-Ukrnafta Okhtyrka – 15th place (Returning after a seasons)
 Zakarpattia Uzhhorod – 16th place (Returning after a seasons)

Withdrawn teams 

On June 26, 2008 MFC Mykolaiv was withdrawn from competitions. On July 1, 2008 the club was announced about the official disbandment. Due to the public pressure and with help of Hryhoriy Surkis, it became possible to preserve the club in professional competitions. MFK Mykolaiv was admitted to the 2008–09 Ukrainian Second League instead of the third team of Dynamo, FC Dynamo-3 Kyiv.

Location

Competition information
Placing of teams in table of standings are done in the following order:
 number of accumulated points
 number of wins
 difference(GD) between goals for(GF) and goals allowed(GA)
 number of goals for(GF)
 The League Fair-play ranking
The next tie-break is a simple draw.

Final standings

Results

Top scorers

Managers

Withdrawn teams

Komunalnyk Luhansk
After competing in thirteen rounds of the competition Komunalnyk Luhansk withdrew from the PFL on October 17, 2008. The PFL annulled all the results from the competition and adjusted the standings.
Komunalnyk had a record of 2 wins, 1 draw and 10 losses scoring 12 goals and having 31 goals scored against them in the thirteen games that they played in. At the end of the 13th round Komunalnyk was in 17th place in the standings. Yuri Kudinov was team's leading goal scorer with 8 goals (3 penalties).

Knyazha Schaslyve
Knyazha withdrew on the March 25, 2009. The PFL will award technical victories to teams that are to play against Knyazha after the winter break.
Knyazha in 18 games had a record of 5 wins, 5 draws, and 8 losses scoring 22 goals and having 23 goals scored against them. At the end of the 18th round Knyazha was in 14th place in the standings. Oleksandr Mandziuk was team's leading goal scorer with 9 goals.

Ihroservis Simferopol
Ihroservis failed to pay league dues on time and were excluded from competitions for the next season.

Awards
 Best coach – Yuri Maximov (Obolon)
 Best official – Yevhen Aranovsky (Kyiv)
 Best player – Oleksandr Pischur (Volyn)
 Best scorer – Oleksandr Pischur (Volyn)
 Fair Play Champion – FC Stal Alchevsk

See also
2008–09 Ukrainian Second League
2008–09 Ukrainian Premier League

References

External links 
  Professional Football League of Ukraine – website of the professional football league of Ukraine
  2008-09 season's regulations. PFL of Ukraine and Football Federation of Ukraine.

Ukrainian First League seasons
2008–09 in Ukrainian association football leagues
Ukra